A cargo cult is a type of a ritualistic belief system.

Cargo cult may also refer to:

 Cargo cult science, a term coined by Richard Feynman to describe something that appears to be science but that lacks scientific integrity
 Cargo cult programming, a style of computer programming that includes code or programs with no real purpose
 Cargo Cult (musician), an ambient and electronica musician
 Cargo Cult Press, publisher of limited-edition horror novels
 "Cargo Culte," a song by Serge Gainsbourg